Kix is the debut album by the glam metal band Kix. It was released in 1981 on Atlantic Records.

Track listing
All tracks written by Donnie Purnell, except where indicated
Side one
 "Atomic Bombs" – 3:45
 "Love at First Sight" (Brian Forsythe, Steve Whiteman) – 2:42) 
 "Heartache" – 3:16
 "Poison" – 3:46
 "The Itch" – 4:26

Side two
 "Kix Are for Kids" – 4:16 
 "Contrary Mary" (Forsythe, Purnell, Jimmy Chalfant, Ronnie Younkins, Whiteman) – 3:10
 "The Kid" – 3:54
 "Yeah, Yeah, Yeah" (Forsythe, Purnell, Chalfant, Younkins, Whiteman) – 6:57

Personnel
Kix
Steve Whiteman – lead vocals, harmonica, saxophone
Ronnie Younkins – guitars
Brian Forsythe – guitars
Donnie Purnell – bass, backing vocals, keyboards
Jimmy Chalfant – drums, backing vocals, percussion

Production
Tom Allom – producer
Bill Dooley – engineer
Ed Garcia, Joe Procopio, Mark Ross, Michael O'Reilly – assistant engineers
Bob Ludwig – mastering at Masterdisk, New York
Bob Defrin – art direction

References

External links
Kix Official Website
Guitar.com 2014 interview with Kix guitarist Brian Forsythe

1981 debut albums
Kix (band) albums
Albums produced by Tom Allom
Atlantic Records albums